Rosa Silvana Abate (born 11 December 1963) is an Italian politician who has been a Senator from Calabria for the Five Star Movement since 2018.

References

See also 
 List of current Italian senators

Living people
1963 births
21st-century Italian politicians
21st-century Italian women politicians
Senators of Legislature XVIII of Italy
People from Calabria
Five Star Movement politicians
20th-century Italian women
Women members of the Senate of the Republic (Italy)